A helion (symbol h) is the nucleus of a helium atom, a doubly positively charged cation. The term helion is a portmanteau of helium and ion, and in practice refers specifically to the nucleus of the helium-3 isotope, consisting of two protons and one neutron. The nucleus of the other stable isotope of helium, helium-4, which consists of two protons and two neutrons, is called an alpha particle.

This particle is the daughter product in the beta-minus decay of tritium, an isotope of hydrogen:

{| border="0"
|- style="height:2em;"
|||→ || ||+ || ||+ ||
|}

CODATA reports the mass of a helion particle as  = 

Helions are intermediate products in the proton–proton chain reaction in stellar fusion.

An antihelion is the antiparticle of a helion, consisting of two antiprotons and an antineutron.

References

Nuclear chemistry
Helium